David Murray (15 February 18858 May 1928) was an Australian politician and member of the New South Wales Legislative Assembly from 1921 until his death in 1928. He was a member of the Labor Party (ALP).

Murray was born in Balmain, New South Wales and was educated to elementary level at St Benedict's School, Chippendale. He was employed as a painter by the New South Wales Government Railways in Newcastle, New South Wales but was dismissed during the 1917 strike. He was eventually re-employed in a lower graded position as a car cleaner. Murray became an official of the Amalgamated Coach-workers Union. At the 1920 state election, conducted by proportional representation, he was the fourth (and first unsuccessful) candidate on the ALP list for the 5 member seat of Newcastle. Consequently he was appointed to the parliament on the death of William Kearsley. He was re-elected at the 1922 and 1925 elections. After the abolition of proportional representation and multi-member seats he was elected to the seat of Hamilton at the 1927election but died in the following year and was succeeded by James Smith. He did not hold ministerial or party office.

References

  

1885 births
1928 deaths
Members of the New South Wales Legislative Assembly
Australian Labor Party members of the Parliament of New South Wales
20th-century Australian politicians